Seventh Day Baptist Church is a historic Baptist church located at DeRuyter, Madison County, New York.  It was built about 1835 and is a two-story, rectangular frame meeting house, sheathed in clapboard and with a gable roof.  It features a small projecting pavilion on the front facade and a multi-stage centered steeple. The church membership decided to close in 1991 and the building was deconsecrated in 2000.  The building was subsequently acquired by the Tromptown Historical Society.

It was listed on the National Register of Historic Places in 2005.

References

External links

Tromptown Historical Society website

Baptist churches in New York (state)
Churches on the National Register of Historic Places in New York (state)
19th-century Baptist churches in the United States
Churches in Madison County, New York
National Register of Historic Places in Madison County, New York